= Kodliwad =

Kodliwad Kodliwad
- Village
- Country: India
- State: Karnataka
- District: Belgaum

Government
  - Type: Panchayat raj
  - Body: Gram panchayat

Languages
  - Official: Kannada
- Time zone: UTC+5:30 (IST)
- Postal code: 591129
- ISO 3166 code: IN-KA
- Vehicle registration: KA 22, KA 49, KA 24
- Website: karnataka.gov.in

Kodliwad is a village in Yaragatti Taluka, Belgaum district in Karnataka, India. The main Occupation is Agriculture.
